Bunji-ye Maski (also Romanized as Būnjī-ye Maskī and Būnjī Meskī; also known as Bangi, Bānjī, Banjī Meskī, Bonjī, and Būnjī) is a village in Kangan Rural District, in the Central District of Jask County, Hormozgan Province, Iran. At the 2006 census, its population was 583, in 97 families.

References 

Populated places in Jask County